Tom Machan (born 1942 or 1943) is a Canadian football player who played for the Edmonton Eskimos. He previously played football for the Edmonton Huskies.

References

Living people
1940s births
Edmonton Elks players
Players of Canadian football from Alberta